Palpita fraterna is a moth in the family Crambidae. It was described by Frederic Moore in 1888. It is found in India, Nepal, Zhejiang, China and Cambodia.

References

Moths described in 1888
Palpita
Moths of Asia